Gloria J. Romero (born July 10, 1955) is a former California State Senator and the Democratic majority leader of the California State Senate from 2005 until 2008. She was the first woman to ever hold that leadership position.

Early life and career
Romero grew up in Barstow, one of six children. Her father worked in the railroad yards and her mother, who left school after sixth grade, stayed home and raised the kids. Romero received her associate's degree from Barstow Community College before going on to earn a B.A. and an M.A. from California State University, Long Beach and a Ph.D. in psychology from the University of California, Riverside.

She taught as a professor at state universities and served as a trustee and vice president of the board of trustees of Los Angeles Community College District.

Legislative career
She was elected to the California State Assembly in 1998 and to the Senate in 2001.  Romero represented the 24th district, which included East Los Angeles, portions of the city of Los Angeles, as well as a major part of the San Gabriel Valley, including the cities of Azusa, Baldwin Park, Covina, Duarte, El Monte, City of Industry, Irwindale, La Puente, Monterey Park, Rosemead, West Covina and Whittier.

In 2008, Romero stepped down as Majority Leader and became chairman of the Education Committee. In that position she authored and guided to passage a fiercely contested ‘parent trigger’ law which allows a majority of parents in a "failing school" to vote on a method to restructure the school.

Romero was term-limited in 2010.

Campaign for State Superintendent of Public Instruction
Following U.S. Representative Hilda Solis's December 2008 selection to become U.S. Secretary of Labor by President-elect Barack Obama (and expected subsequent confirmation), Romero indicated strong interest in running in the special election for California's 32nd congressional district to replace her, but later chose to run for the nonpartisan California State Superintendent of Public Instruction instead. Romero was supported by advocates of charter schools, while her two major opponents were supported by teachers unions and school administrators, respectively. Eventually, Romero finished third, receiving 17.0% of the vote in a crowded 12-person field.

Post-legislative career and charter school industry support
Romero led the California chapter of Democrats for Education Reform, a reform wing of the Democratic Party supporting privatization of public schools. In the 2012 election, she supported California's Prop. 32 that would bar workers from donating to their unions' Political Action Committees (PACs) using payroll deductions. She founded Scholarship Prep Charter School, which enrolls TK-8th grade students in low income communities.

In the 2021 California gubernatorial recall election, she endorsed Republican Larry Elder.

As a public university professor in California, she is a member of the California Faculty Association.

References

External links
Democrats for Education Reform (official website)

Join California Gloria Romero

Democratic Party California state senators
California State University, Long Beach alumni
Living people
Democratic Party members of the California State Assembly
American politicians of Mexican descent
American academics of Mexican descent
Hispanic and Latino American state legislators in California
People from Barstow, California
University of California, Riverside alumni
1955 births
Women state legislators in California
Hispanic and Latino American women in politics
Education activists
21st-century American politicians
21st-century American women politicians